Banjani was a tribe of Old Herzegovina, and historical region in western Montenegro. Its territory comprises , west of Nikšić, in the centre between Nikšić and Bileća, from the top of Njegoš mountain to the Trebišnjica river, and on to the Bileća Lake. All Banjani families have Jovanjdan (St. John's feast day, January 20) as their slava (a Serbian Orthodox tradition).

Geography
The Banjani is located between 42 degrees, 45 minutes and 43 degrees north latitude, and lies 18 degrees east of the Greenwich meridian, between 30 and 46 minutes.  Petrovići village with its direct surroundings (coastal Trebišnjica) is called the Lower Banjani.  This is the lowest section of the tribe and descends below 400 meters above sea level.

The rest of the tribe is called the Upper Banjani, the villages of which range from 800 to 1,100 meters above sea level. The Jelovica peaks rise between 1,100 and 1,280 meters above sea level. The peaks of Mt. Somina and Mt. Bratogošt both exceed this height. The highest peak of Njegoš is Ravna Glavica (flat head), which rises 1,721 meters above sea level.

In the central part of the tribal territory is a small town named Velimlje, at the very edge of Velimlje field, a karst field of three to four square kilometers, with its lowest section just under 800 meters above sea level, ending in a funnel-like recess, where it once flowed into the distant sea. This territory is of heavy karst, with lower and higher elevations covered with layers of limestone and dolomite rocks. A small area of arable land is located in depressions and on terraced surfaces. This land base provides scant vegetation, with rain falling in the vegetative period from May to September, and surface water is almost nonexistent.

Thin springs Jama Matovića, and Tupanjska river and springs flow to Mt. Njegoš. Through the neighborhoods of Upper Banjani flow Kruška (Pear), Crni Kuk (Black Hip), and Sopot flows through the Lower Banjani. Weak springs, called pištet or bučalina, named Zaboj, flow through Mokri Do, in a village Dubočke, providing a small, relatively insignificant seasonal water flow. Another weak spring (pištet) named Hercegove Luke flows to Mt. Somina.  The people of this region make pools where rainwater can collect.

Karst terrains, especially heavy karst area such as the Banjani, are affected by accelerated erosion processes that also adversely affect the wildlife, as well as the population itself.  In ancient times, this area received scarce water, which affected the soil complexes, flora and fauna.  Below Mt. Njegos, the Tupanjska river flows through the village of Riječani. The current Velimlje field was likely under water in ancient times and, during modern times, this area has been flooded by autumn rains. The Banjani coastal area around the river of Trebišnjica (today Bileca Lake) has a mild climate due to the influence of the Mediterranean sun. The main part of the tribe's territory has a temperate continental climate, while the only mountain of this region has a mountain climate. The tribal territory experiences fairly uniform annual distributions and amounts of rainfall.

History

The first written mention of the Banjani is in 1319. Some scholars argued that the name could derive from balnea (sr. banja), which means "bath" or "spa". According to oral tradition, the tribal name comes from Banjska in Kosovo from where they migrated.

Sir Arthur Evans noted that the Banjani were mentioned as Serbs in Herzegovina and Montenegro of the Middle Ages in Ragusan reports and Serbian chrysobulls. In Herzegovina were situated on the territory of Jezera and Piva. At the end of 14th century katunar (head of the tribe) was Jurek Junaković, later Herak Draženović of Radovan (1412), a certain Nenad (1432), and so on. Initially vassals of Pavlović (1430), in 1444 and 1463 they were recorded as vassals of Stjepan Vukčić Kosača. They are mentioned in mid-15th century documents from the Bay of Kotor.

At the time of the Ottoman occupation in 1466, the Banjani became part of southeastern Sanjak of Herzegovina. During occupation many Vlachs, including from Banjani, collaborated with the Ottomans as slave agents.

In Jovan Radonjić's letter from 1789. to Queen Catherine II. in asking for support from Empress of Russia for the Serbs from different tribes and regions, Banjani were also included.

Geography
The Banjani are central to the area between Nikšić and Bileća, from the top of Njegoš mountain, where the ancestors of the Petrović-Njegoš lived in the Muževice village (and who, as a merchant family, came from Zenica in Bosnia), to the Trebišnjica and Bileća Lake area. The surface area of the Banjani's territory is about 380 square kilometers, contiguous with other Montenegrin tribes: Golija to the north, Trepačke Rudine to the east, Grahovo to the south, and west to the state border of the Republika Srpska in Bosnia and Herzegovina (the Oputne Rudine region).

In the past, the tribal borders to the south and east were different. The tribe bordering on Riđani was another Vlach tribe-clan that assimilated or migrated at the end of the 17th century, then formed two new clans: Grahovo and Trepačke Rudine. The newly formed tribes extended to the territory of the Banjani. Mountain ranges, Mt. Njegoš and Mt. Somina form a natural border to the north. Brekovac, Bratogošt, and Tisovac extend down to Trebišnjica and Bilećko Lake from the northwest to the southwest border.  he southern and eastern boundaries of Banjani travel over hilly terrain, with no major natural barriers.

Banjani society

Banjani is a little-explored area of significant prehistoric and turbulent history. A Neanderthal tooth and millstone were found at the Crvena stijena (red rock), archaeological site in the Lower Banjani, dating the earliest inhabitants of this territory to the Paleolithic, Neolithic and bronze periods. A number of ruins and piles (or barrows) testify to the end of the people of the territory prior to their taking on some of the urban characteristics of the Bronze and Iron Ages.

The history of this territory began with the Romans whose routes took them through the current Banjani territory. The important Roman roads passed by the Banjani village of Riječani on their way to Duklja and Skadar, where the Romans built forts. The Slavs in this region, and its wider environment, settled in the first half of the seventh century, pushing the sparse Roman and Illyrian populations of the mountain crags. The Slavs quickly built a state system, and appointed local leaders. In the early Middle Ages (around the eighth or ninth century), the government system became a banovina (principality) and belonged to the parish Onogošt. The various parishes joined to form an Onogošt Podgorje area (called Submontana in Latin), which belonged to the Kingdom of Duklja.

Duklja (Zeta) became part of Raska (Serbia) around the 1180s. Banjani became a part of Raska (therefore Nemanjic state) and, less than two centuries later, became part of Bosnia, which fell to the Turks in 1466.

This territory was probably composed of smaller administrative units (banovina) in the early Slavic period. One micro-location in the Banjani territory was called Banova stolica ("the ban throne"), still recognized by the stone seat on which it is believed that a ban convened meetings at the time.  Later, in the time of the Turks and their administration, the area became a nahija (Turkish administrative unit), probably because it had attained a certain autonomy, which even during the Turkish administration became organized as a tribe with tribal representatives.

According to ethnologists, the basic cell for the development of the tribe was the katun. The semi-nomadic people bred cattle in the summer on the mountain in the summer pasture and in the winter in the rural village on the bay. These cattle were inherited from Vlachs, Romans, Illyrians and other Balkan natives. One pasture would serve about 20 houses, and families were headed by katunar. From the 16th century, a community of more neighboring pastures, often allied and linked together, made up the tribe led by the duke. An important role in the survival of the tribe at the time of the Turks was played by the priesthood, trying to maintain the people fully into Orthodoxy. This was facilitated by the proximity to Old Montenegro, organized tribal communities, and Cetinje, Kotor, Dubrovnik and Venice, cities that have had economic and political ties with this region.

The first Banjani duke came from the Petrovic. They were related to the later Montenegrin dynasty Petrovic-Njegoš. Duke Ivan Petrovic was a contemporary of Duke Grdan Niksic. Petrovići lived in the Lower Banjani, in a village named Petrovići, from whom are descended some of today's Banjani clans: Kneževići, Popovici and Pejovići. Of these, the Popović clan lived in the village Trepcha, near of the Nikšić. From the mid-17th to mid-18th century, the Matovic clan from the Banjani village Prigradina gave away the duchy (no longer referred to by the Banjani as duke). The chief prince of the village Klenak, Mulina Peter was succeeded by the duchy of the Matović clan from Prigradina, which has become hereditary.

The next prince was the son of Peter, Baćo, and then Vasilj Baćov, who took the name of the father (Baćović), who stabilized the tribe and area for his descendants. He succeeded his son Jovan (John) Baćović, who gained the title of Duke. He was killed in battle for liberation from the Turks in 1862 in Banjani, and his successor, Duke Maksim Baćović, died in 1876.

The duchy was then transferred to Maksim's uncle, Simo. In addition to Duke, Banjani had the Serdar title (a high rank of nobility). The most prominent leader of the Banjani during the first half of the 19th century was Rade Bozov Miljanić and his son, the Banjani hero Miljanić Djoko, who received the title of Serdar. With his last name Miljanić, he added his father's name Radović, and was given the tribal name of Banjanin. The last Serdar tribe was Marko Đokov Radovic-Miljanić.

The Komnenović is an old and very powerful clan in Banjani. They built a church at Tupan in the early 17th century. They ruled a large part of the territory of the Banjani and had a summer pasture in Durmitor. Gambelići, or Milovići, is also known as an old Banjani house.  Ognjenović also had tribal leaders during the 18th and 19th centuries.

Koprivica is an old Banjani clan and the largest in the tribe for the last two centuries. They are the most famous house in the priesthood of Banjani.  The priests served the tribe for more than five centuries. From the Koprivica clan came the Serbian patriarch Arsenije IV Jovanović Šakabenta. The Koprivica clan led the priest caste, and Miljanić clan, as the most heroic, led the warrior caste in Banjani.

Banjani territory on the border of Montenegro was liberated from the Turks in 1878, and the tribe has become one of Montenegro's largest provinces, named Kapetanija ("captaincy"), with the kapetan ("captain", a governor) at the helm. The first kapetan of the freed Banjani was Gišan Radović-Miljanić, who briefly managed the community, before disagreements with Prince Nikola I led to its inheritance of Ćetko Pejov Eraković. Ćetko was succeeded by his nephew Jevto Pejovic-Eraković.

In the Interwar period and after World War II, the Banjani district became the municipality of Niksic, and presidents of municipalities have been from a number of Banjani clans. Since 1960, the Banjani have been without municipal status, but have become part of the large municipality of Niksic.

Anthropology
The patron saint feast day (slava) of the Banjani is St. John the Baptist (Jovanjdan), January 20, although there are clans who do not celebrate it. The meeting place was Kruška, where they held the clan assembly and made important decisions. Some words are kept in the monastery Kosijerevo, mostly those of wider significance.

Slavs absorbed the remnants of Roman and Romanized population. It is said that roughly half of the population descends from native peoples, which are known to have lived in Banjani for at least four centuries. The tribe of Mataruge lived in the region prior to the 14th century, and at least some of the families may descend from this tribe. Some sources maintain that Banjani was dispersed in the second half of the 15th century, during the Ottoman conquest. Those older Banjani were settled in western Bosnia, and then further, by the Ottomans as part of their campaigns. Banjani was resettled with refugees from other Serbian regions, from which the majority of inhabitants descend from. These families formed brotherhoods which constituted the tribe of Banjani beginning in the 16th century. Ethnographical works show that migration waves came from modern-day southern Serbia (including Kosovo), North Macedonia, Bosnia, and the regions of Brda and Old Montenegro in what is now Montenegro.

Montenegrin tribes often originate from a common ancestor, as is the example with other tribe-clans, however, this is not the case with Banjani. For example, the Miljanić clan is known to have originated from Miljan who, with his father Milisav and other brothers Bijele and Mrko (from whom arise the Bijelović and Mrkajić clans), came from Velestovo (Čevo), in the middle of the 16th century, from the Old Montenegrin tribe Ozrinići, located in Katunska nahija, in the old Montenegro.

Velimlje is the only village in Banjani that in the late 19th century acquired the status of town. It existed as a clerical-trade settlement until 1960, when it lost the status of the municipal center, which became the local city hall.

Banjani villages currently include Klenak, Koprivice, Macavare, Milovići, Miljanići, Petrovići, Prigradina, Riječani, Tupan. Each of these villages has a number of villages or small groups of houses, which can be extracted as a separate village. For example, the village Miljanići includes five villages: Dubočke, Birač, Muževice, Rusenovići, and Jelovica, as well as their central settlement, Miljanići.  Koprivica also consists of several villages: Renovac, Šake, Čista Vlaka, Crni Kuk, and Šljeme.

In the last two centuries, the Banjani have had about 40 clans. For some time, the clans disappeared from the tribe, their male descendants shrinking until the clans were gone, although they contributed to the frequent emigration from the passive lands. In the last half century, some of the Banjani families have shifted to nearby towns, and no longer live in the tribe, though they retain their property. Some have emerged from one of two clans, as a branch of a clan officially declared a "special clan". A small part of the descendants of the Miljanić clan, in the late 19th century, were called Radovići. Velimlje built up as a small town, and developed systems of education and transport. They are considered outsiders, and are not considered Banjani. However, if three generations have lived in the tribe, they feel they should be considered as Banjani as the other clans.

Banjani families include Antović, Baćović, Bijelović, Bakoč, Vasiljević, Gligović, Draganić, Djurković, Drašković, Elezović, Eraković, Zečević, Jovović, Kapetinić, Kecojević, Kilibarda, Prince, Kovač, Kokotović, Komnenović, Koprivica, Kosanović, Kosović, Krivokapić, Krušić, Lazarević, Avlijaš, Lučić, Manojlović, Marković, Matović, Milović, Milošević, Miljanić, Mirković, Mićović, Mišković, Mrkajić, Nikolić, Ognjenović, Orbović, Papić, Pejović, Perović, Popović, Radojević, Radović, Rupar, Sarić and Tomašević.

Clans and families
The Banjani are a somewhat complex tribe. The Koprivica and Miljanic family clans have large landed property in the tribe with its clan church and a cemetery. They have shared the glory of the old tradition for over four-and-one-half centuries, and at least 17 generations.

The families of the Banjani clan, by the villages they inhabit, are:

Crkvice - Tomaševići
Crni Kuk, Čista Vlaka, Šake, Renovac - Koprivice, Rupari
Dolovi - Erakovići, Kilibarde
Dubočke, Birač - Miljanići, Milovići
Dukat - Erakovići, Kilibarde
Jelovica - Miljanići
Klenak - Orbovići, Antovići, Baćovići, Đurkovići, Komnenovići, Lučići, Tomaševići, Zečevići
Koprivice, Cerovica - Koprivice, Elezovići, Ognjenovići, Pejovići, Rupari
Macavare - Mirkovići, Perovići
Miljanići - Miljanići
Muževice - Miljanići
Petrovići - Janičići, Kneževići, Mrkajići, Pejovići, Popovići, Vasiljevići, Draganići, Kovači
Podljut - Bijelovići, Đurkovići, Elezovići, Milovići, Radojevići
Prigradina - Matovići, Mićovići, Krušići
Riječani - Andrijaševići, Kilibarde, Nikolići
Rusenovići - Ognjenovići, Miljanići
Tupan (Upper and Lower) - Bakoči, Erakovići, Kilibarde, Sarići
Velimlje – Papići, Radojevići, Lazarevići

Cultural heritage
The cultural heritage of Banjani includes a variety of subjects and objects created by the human hand, which sought to perpetuate spirituality. The millstone of the Crvena Stijena (red rock) dating from the Bronze Age is a well-known monument. Heritage values are those of the ancient water, ublovi, which has provided more space to Banjani, and dates back to antiquity, but were built later.

Traces of circular stone structures on the tops of some hills, so-called forts, are scattered throughout Banjani, and date from the late Bronze and early Iron Ages.

Ancient graves line old roads through Banjani and its environment. Science have dated them from the early Iron Age, but some may date from an earlier period, and many of them have survived. Some are big stone hills, four or five meters high, and perhaps more in diameter on the ground, and 100 meters across. Their purpose is defined to memorialize the ancestral grave-tribal leader and ancient Balkan ephors, and Enchelii, usually attributed to the Illyrians. Graveyards in neighboring Herzegovina show that each of them has at least one grave, facing in different directions, whereas larger graveyards house more graves. Beside skeletons were found bronze and iron objects, such as weapons of warriors, women and jewelry.

In this region, a few characters are written in stone, written by human hand in the distant past, in addition to signs that the hand of a man entered the lines or in rocks formed by nature.  Archaeologists have found a Latin inscription in stones in the village of Riječani (castrum Saltua) from Roman times.

Monuments

Many of the medieval churches were destroyed during Ottoman rule. Only some of them were restored and rebuilt during the restoration of the Serbian Patriarchate of Peć, forming the basis of some medieval churches, such as Kosijerevo, a 14th-century Serbian Orthodox monastery. Today, not a single church or monastery remains from the Middle Ages. There is the possibility that the later churches, or at least some of them, were built on medieval foundations.

The Church of St. Sava in Prigradina village, hamlet Počivala, was a painted church during the restoration of the Patriarchate of Peć, during the early 17th century. It is the oldest church in the tribe and was raised at the time of the Nemanjić dynasty. The second story was raised by the founder of clan Matović and Krušić, who was captured in Kosovo who as an Islamized man, gave money for its construction. At the time, the Turks were protected, and there was a secret entrance for the Orthodox faithful. This temple may have been built on the foundations of a medieval church.  The church is now under state protection, mainly because of the paintings.
The Church of Archangel Michael is also in Prigradina, near the town Velimlje. The significance of this church is that it has the status of a cathedral. Built in 1867, it has murals and is built on the foundations of an earlier temple, about which little is known.
Medieval holy Church St. John the Baptist, in Petrovići, Drijenak hamlet, is the mausoleum of the dukes in the second half of the 15th century. In it was buried Duke Cvjetko Banjanin and his son Duke Grban Cvjetković Banjanin.
The Church of the Archangel Michael, in the village Petrovići, Stražnica hamlet, dates from the late 16th century, painted in 1605, that at the time of Duke Banjani was Ivan Petrovic and the family temple of Petrović.
The Church of St. John the Baptist, in Klenje, 3 km from Velimlje, was built by the Miljanić clan at the beginning of 17th century.
The Church of St. Ilija in the Petrovići region is an old church, dating from the early 17th century, and was raised by the Mrkajići clan.

There are many "clan churches" in Banjani. Generally, the higher or related clans have their common church. The Komnenović, Koprivica and Miljanić clans have their own church. Some clans also share churches, such as the Mirković and Perović, and the Eraković and Kilibarda, as well as other related clans.

Banjani are known for their tombstones, stećak, mainly dating to the 14th century. At several locations, monuments were built on earlier cemeteries.

Foundation
The Banjani has feelings for the common good and contributes to special occasions part of his wealth for what is the significance of the public good.  On Tupan, one of the Banjani villages, part of a field is called the church grounds. There are innumerable examples that people have invested their goods for reconstruction (or raising) of churches, schools, orphanages, roads, and libraries, assisting the single, orphans, and the poor. Legends say that some Islamized men of Banjani helped the village from which they originated. Zaim, an Islamized man by the Zečević clan, gave money to his relatives in building a water supply, which is named after him and Zaimovača. Water at the Velimlje named "Vladičina voda" (Bishop's water) was built with the help of money provided by Hadži Sava Kosanović, a Banjani native, the Bishop of Sarajevo, who clashed with occupation measures in Bosnia and Herzegovina conducted Benjamin Kalaj.

Velimlje hospital was founded by professor of medicine of Belgrade University Dr. Niko Miljanić, from Banjani. Aljo Radojevic has provided money to build sewers in Velimljsko Prisoje, to help maintain the livestock in the area. Stanislav-Ćano Koprivica was raised a small factory in Velimlje, which employed about 30 workers, but, unfortunately, closed down during the war in Yugoslavia in 1991.

Diaspora
Banjani for centuries has been a lively area of immigration-emigration. Many of the famous Serbian families and individuals originated from these tribes. Banjani settled in Valjevo (Serbia), where there is a village named Banjani near Ub and Brankovina. The origin of this tribe from the clan Miljanić are the family Nenadović (Duke Aleksa Nenadović, priest Mateja Nenadovic, Duke Jakov Nenadović, and writer Ljuba Nenadović), national hero Ilija Birčanin, and Lazarevic (priest Luka Lazarevic).

Part of the Miljanić clan settled over areas in Croatia, such as Mihanići village near Dubrovnik, Škabrnja and Kruševo villages near Šibenik, Golubić village near Knin, and Pisarovina village near Zagreb. They also emigrated, with other Banjani, to Argentina (Buenos Aires and Chaco province), the U.S. (Washington D.C., New York, Chicago, Minnesota, Montana, California and Alaska), Canada (Toronto and Vancouver), and Vojvodina, the northern region of Serbia (Novi Sad, Vrbas, Kula, Lovćenac, and Crvenka).

Notable people
born in Banjani
Novak Kilibarda, Montenegrin politician and writer, born in Banjani
Božo Koprivica, Montenegrin and Yugoslav essayist and literary critic, born in Nikšić
Radmila Miljanić-Petrović, Montenegrin handball player, born in Nikšić
Mirko Kovač, Yugoslav writer, born in Petrovići
Vida Ognjenović, Serbian playwright, writer and diplomat, born in Dubočke
Krsto Papić, Montenegrin film director and screenwriter, born in Vučji Do

by descent
Miljan Miljanić, Yugoslav footballer, coach and administrator, family from Banjani
Arsenije IV Jovanović Šakabenta, Serbian Patriarch, by paternal descent
Ilija Birčanin, Serbian duke, by paternal descent
Aleksa Nenadović, Serbian duke, by paternal descent
Jakov Nenadović, one of the leaders of the First Serbian Uprising and first Serbian Minister of Interior, younger brother of Aleksa
Petar Baćović, Montenegrin Chetnik, by paternal descent
Jorge Capitanich, Argentine politician, by paternal descent
Niko Miljanić, Serbian anatomist and surgeon, born in Cetinje
Slaviša Koprivica, former Serbian basketball player, by paternal descent

See also

Banjani (Ub), Village in Kolubara District, Serbia
Banjani (Sokolac), is a village in the municipality of Sokolac, Bosnia and Herzegovina.
Banjane, village in the municipality of Čučer-Sandevo, North Macedonia
Banjani, Bosanska Krupa, village in Bosnia and Herzegovina
Donji Banjani, Village in Kolubara, Serbia
Gornji Banjani, Village in Moravica District, Serbia
Grahovljani, Historical region
Vlachs in medieval Bosnia and Herzegovina
Montenegrin clans

References

Sources
 
 
 Momčilo S. Mićović: Mićovići iz Banjana u svom vremenu, Beograd, 2001.
 Momčilo S. Mićović: Prigradina u vremenu i prostoru, Beograd 2007
 Svetozar Tomić: Banjani, Beograd, SANU, 1949.
 Slobodan Raičević: Spomenici u staroj župi Onogošt, Beograd, 1992.
Dimitrije-Dimo Vujovic, Prilozi izucavanju crnogorskog nacionalnog pitanja /The Research of the Montenegrin Nationality/ (Niksic: Univerzitetska rijec, 1987), p. 172.

Nikšić
Regions of Montenegro
Tribes of Montenegro
Vlachs in the history of Bosnia and Herzegovina
Serbs of Bosnia and Herzegovina